The 1993 Cal Poly Mustangs football team represented California Polytechnic State University during the 1993 NCAA Division I-AA football season. This was the first season they competed at the Division I-AA level, as they had previously been at the Division II level.

Cal Poly competed in the inaugural season of American West Conference (AWC). They had previously played in the Western Football Conference (WFC), which folded after the 1992 season. The Mustangs were led by seventh-year head coach Lyle Setencich and played home games at Mustang Stadium in San Luis Obispo, California. They finished the season with a record of six wins and four losses (6–4, 1–3 AWC). Overall, the team outscored its opponents 365–201 for the season. This was the last year for coach Setencich at the helm. He compiled a record of 41–29–2 in his seven years at Cal Poly.

Schedule

Notes

References

Cal Poly
Cal Poly Mustangs football seasons
Cal Poly Mustangs football